Muhammad Asghar or Mohammad Asghar may refer to:

 Mohammad Asghar (cricketer) (born 1998)
 Muhammad Habib Asghar (born 1990), Pakistani weightlifter
 Mohammad Asghar (1945–2020), known as Oscar, Welsh politician